Arthur H. Wicks (December 24, 1887 – February 1985) was an American politician from New York.

Life
He was born on December 24, 1887, in New York City. He owned a steam laundry in Kingston, New York.

He was a member of the New York State Senate from 1927 to 1956, sitting in the 150th, 151st, 152nd, 153rd, 154th, 155th, 156th, 157th, 158th, 159th, 160th, 161st, 162nd, 163rd, 164th, 165th, 166th, 167th, 168th, 169th and 170th New York State Legislatures; and was Temporary President of the State Senate from 1949 to 1953. He was an alternate delegate to the 1940 and 1944, and a delegate to the 1948, 1952 and 1956 Republican National Conventions.

On October 1, 1953, he became Acting Lieutenant Governor of New York, but was forced to resign on November 18, 1953, as temporary president and acting lieutenant governor when it became known that he had made frequent visits to convicted labor leader Joseph S. Fay while the latter was incarcerated at Sing-Sing prison.

He died in February 1985.

Sources

William J. Keating, with Richard Carter: The Man Who Rocked the Boat (Harper & Brothers Publishers, New York, 1956, Library of Congress catalog card number: 56-6025)

1887 births
1985 deaths
Lieutenant Governors of New York (state)
Republican Party New York (state) state senators
Politicians from New York City
Politicians from Kingston, New York
Majority leaders of the New York State Senate
20th-century American politicians